"Brass In Pocket (I'm Special)" is a song by English–American rock band the Pretenders, released in 1979 as the third single from their self-titled debut album. It was written by Chrissie Hynde and James Honeyman-Scott, and produced by Chris Thomas. Originating as a guitar lick written by Honeyman-Scott, the song features a lyric that Hynde explained to be about the cockiness that one needs to effectively perform. The song's title derives from a phrase she overheard after a show.

"Brass in Pocket" became the band's biggest hit to that point, reaching number one in the UK and number 14 in the US. Its music video was the seventh video aired on MTV on its launch on 1 August 1981.

Background
"Brass in Pocket" originated as a guitar line that James Honeyman-Scott played for Chrissie Hynde. Hynde then recorded the part with a tape recorder and wrote the song's lyric. Musically, Hynde described the song as "trying to be a Motown song, but it didn't quite get it."

Hynde got the idea for the song's title when, during an after-show dinner, she overheard someone enquiring if anyone had "Picked up dry cleaning? Any brass in pocket?" Of the song's reference to "bottle," Hynde explained, "Bottle is Cockney rhyming slang. It means bottle and glass. The way Cockney rhyming slang works is the word you're really saying rhymes with the second word. So bottle and glass rhymes with ass. In England, to say somebody has a lot of ass they have a lot of funk. So you say, 'That guy has a lot of bottle. Of the song's meaning, Hynde stated:

During an interview with The Observer in 2004, she revealed she was initially reluctant to have the song released: "When we recorded the song I wasn't very happy with it and told my producer that he could release it over my dead body." Hynde later reflected, "Now I like that song because it's one of those songs that served me well. I didn't like my voice on it. I was kind of a new singer, and listening to my voice made me kind of cringe."

Music and lyric
The lyric describes the female singer about to have her first sexual encounter with a particular person, and is expressing her confidence that the experience will be successful. According to Rolling Stone magazine critic Ken Tucker, the song uses "an iron fist as a metaphor for [Hynde's] sexual clout." The Rolling Stone Album Guide critic J. D. Considine describes the song as "sassy" and credits the band for "putting bounce in each step" of it. Author Simon Reynolds similarly describes Hynde's vocal as "pure sass" and "a feline narcissism," noting particularly her "lingering languorously" over the words "I'm special".

According to AllMusic critic Steve Huey, the backbeat "meshes very nicely with Hynde's unshakable confidence, and the song never gets aggressive enough to break its charming spell or make her self-assurance seem implausibly idealized." Huey also points out a harmonic shift in the music for the portion of the song where the singer lists the various attractive qualities she will use to make the encounter a success.  Ultimate Classic Rock critic Bryan Wawzenek rated it one of drummer Martin Chambers' top 10 Pretenders songs, praising the relaxed groove and saying that "The beat is weighty but soft, and it allows plenty of room for Chrissie Hynde to side-step her way through the single."

Dave Thompson suggests that the song is actually about the Pretenders' first live concert rather than a sexual experience.

Cash Box said the song shows why Hynde was "quickly emerging as one of the bright new singer/stylists of 1980," highlighting "her sly, sexy warbling and tremendous control." Ultimate Classic Rock critic Matt Wardlaw rated it the Pretenders best song, saying that it is the song "all of the elements really came together – a cool groove and an especially sultry vocal from Hynde."  

"Brass" is a Northern English expression for money, harking back to the days when non-silver coins, or "coppers", were worth something. The reference for the term "Detroit leaning" in the lyric is unclear.

Release
"Brass in Pocket" was released as the band's third single. It was their first big success, scoring number one on the UK Singles Chart for two weeks in January 1980 (making it the first new number-one single of the 1980s), number two in Australia during May 1980 (for three weeks), and number 14 on the Billboard Hot 100 chart in the United States. It was listed at No. 389 on Rolling Stone's "Top 500 Greatest Songs of All Time" in 2021.

In the video for the song Hynde plays a lonely waitress in a backstreet cafe. The rest of the band arrive in a large pink American car driven by Pete Farndon. The three men peruse the menus but are soon joined by their female partners. All six then leave the restaurant. Hynde commented on the ending of the video, "The 'Brass in Pocket' video got hijacked by the director, because the idea of that was that these guys were going to break in on motorcycles and I was going to get on the back and ride out of there. And he had different ideas, and he left me in there crying. That wasn't my script."

The video was filmed in the North Kensington area (north of Notting Hill district and south of Kensal Green area).  The cafe's location was at the intersection of Middle Row and Southern Row, but the cafe has since been replaced with a four-story residential building (50 Middle Row).

Chart performance

Weekly charts

Year-end charts

Certifications

Covers
The song has been covered by Suede for NMEs charity compilation Ruby Trax. It also features in its expanded debut album edition released in 2018.

See also
List of number-one singles of 1980 (Ireland)
List of number-one singles and albums in Sweden
List of UK Singles Chart number ones of the 1980s

References

1979 songs
1979 singles
1980 singles
The Pretenders songs
Irish Singles Chart number-one singles
Number-one singles in South Africa
Number-one singles in Sweden
UK Singles Chart number-one singles
Sire Records singles
Song recordings produced by Chris Thomas (record producer)
Songs written by Chrissie Hynde
Songs written by James Honeyman-Scott